The Puerto Rican flower bat (Phyllonycteris major) is an extinct species of bat from the family Phyllostomidae (leaf-nosed bats). It was native to Puerto Rico and is known only from subfossil skeletal material.

Sources 
 UNEP-WCMC Species Database
 Bucknell University - Wilson & Reeder's: Mammal Species of the World (Third edition)
 ZipCodeZoo.com

References 

Phyllonycteris
Mammal extinctions since 1500
Taxonomy articles created by Polbot
Taxobox binomials not recognized by IUCN